Haakon Sigurdsson (937–995), known as Haakon Jarl (Old Norse: Hákon jarl), was the de facto ruler of Norway from about 975 to 995. Sometimes he is styled as Haakon the Powerful, though the Ágrip and Historia Norwegiæ give the less flattering name Hákon Illi, that is, Haakon the Bad.

Background
Haakon was the son of Sigurd Haakonsson, Jarl of Lade and  ruler of Trøndelag and Hålogaland. His mother was Bergljot Toresdatter, daughter of Tore Ragnvaldsson, Jarl of Møre. Adam of Bremen wrote that he was "of the stock of Ivar (either Ivar the Boneless or Ivar Vidfamne) and descended from a race of giants". In the sagas, Haakon claimed descent from the divine lineage of Sæming, son of Odin. The Hakon Jarl Runestones in Sweden may refer to him.

Reign

Haakon became jarl after his father was killed by King Harald Greycloak's men in 961. Haakon Jarl warred with King Harald for some time, until he was forced to flee to Denmark, where he conspired with Harald Bluetooth against Harald Greycloak.

The two arranged the death of Harald Greycloak around 971, after which Harald Bluetooth invited his foster-son to be invested with new Danish fiefs. Civil war broke out between Haakon Jarl and the surviving brothers of Harald Greycloak, but Haakon proved victorious. After this, Haakon Jarl ruled Norway as a vassal of Harald Bluetooth, but he was in reality an independent ruler. For Harald, he attacked Götaland and killed its ruler Ottar Jarl.

Around 973–974, he went to Denmark to help Harald Bluetooth of Denmark in his defense against the Holy Roman Emperor Otto II. Otto's forces successfully opposed an attempt by Harald to throw off the German yoke. After that Haakon paid no taxes to Denmark.

In 980 he assisted his Ruthenian cousin Vladimir the Great in reclaiming Novgorod from Yaropolk I of Kiev.

Haakon was a strong believer in the old Norse gods, even after Harald Bluetooth forced him to accept baptism around 975 and assigned him clergymen to take to Norway to spread Christianity. When a favourable wind came for Haakon to leave, he commanded the clergymen to return ashore, and broke his allegiance to Denmark. In 977 Vladimir I of Kiev fled to him, collecting as many of the Viking warriors as he could to assist him to recover Novgorod, and on his return the next year marched against Yaropolk I of Kiev.  In 986, a Danish invasion fleet led by the fabled Jomsvikings was defeated at the Battle of Hjörungavágr.

In 995, a quarrel broke out between Haakon and the Trønders just as Olaf Tryggvason, a descendant of Harald Fairhair arrived. Haakon quickly lost all support, and was killed by his own slave and friend, Tormod Kark, while hiding in the pig sty in the farm Rimul in Melhus. Jarlshola is the location in Melhus thought to have been the hiding place of Haakon Jarl and Tormod Kark on their last night before the infamous murder at Rimul. After his death, Haakon Jarl's two sons Eirik Håkonson and Sveinn Hákonarson, fled for protection to the king of Sweden, Olof Skötkonung.

A number of (textually related) sources also recount Earl Haakon's predilection for raping women, whether the daughters of nobles or of commoners.

Children
Eric Haakonsson (960s – 1020s), would avenge his father at the Battle of Svolder and then govern Norway with his half-brother, Sveinn Hákonarson
Sweyn Haakonsson (died c. 1016), co-ruler of Norway
Aud Haakonsdottir, married the Swedish king Eric the Victorious, according to Yngvars saga víðförla
Bergljót Haakonsdottir, married Einar Tambarskjelvar
Sigrid Haakonsdottir, mother of Ivar Hvide, Jarl of Oppland
Sigurd Haakonsson
Ragnhild Haakonsdatter
Erling Haakonsson
Erland Haakonsson
Hemming Haakonsson
 Ramvieg Haakonsdatter

 Source:  Foundation for Medieval Genealogy

Poets

According to Skáldatal, Haakon had the following poets at his court:
Eyvindr Finnsson
Einarr skálaglamm
Tindr Hallkelsson
Skafti Þóroddsson
Þórólfr munnr
Eilífr Guðrúnarson
Vigfúss Víga-Glúmsson
Þorleifr jarlsskáld
Hvannár-Kálfr

Korsvikaspillet
Haakon Jarl is a central figure in Håkon og Kark which is performed annually at the Korsvikaspillet festival in Korsvika in Trondheim. The play is based on the story of Haakon Jarl and Tormod Kark as portrayed in the Sagas by Snorri Sturluson. The first play was a poetic tableau that was made in connection with the 800-year anniversary of the Lade Church  (Lade kirke) in 1989 and repeated two years later. In 1995, Idar Lind wrote a new script. The music is composed by Frode Fjellheim.

Primary sources
Source bases for Haakon Jarl are considerable. He was given  coverage in several sagas, including by Snorri Sturluson in Heimskringla, Ágrip af Nóregskonungasögum and more. According to Hallfreðar saga the poet Hallfreðr composed a drápa on the jarl. Several disjoint stanzas by Hallfreðr in Skáldskaparmál are often thought to belong to this otherwise lost poem.

Oehlenschläger tragedy
Haakon Jarl's life also received literary treatment by Danish poet Adam Oehlenschläger, in his tragedy Hakon Jarl, written in six weeks in 1805  during a stay in Halle, after reading Snorri's Heimskringla. The theme is the conflict between paganism and Christianity. There is an English translation by J. C. Lindberg. Oehlenschläger's play later formed the basis for Smetana's symphonic poem Hakon Jarl.

References

Other sources
Foote, P. G., and D. M. Wilson (1970) The Viking Achievement  (Macmillan Company) 
Gjerset, Knut  (1915) History of The Norwegian People (Macmillan Company) 
Jones, Gwyn (1973)  A History of the Vikings (Oxford University Press) 
Krag, Claus (2000) Norges historie fram til 1319 (Universitetsforlaget) 
Larsen, Karen  (1948) A History of Norway (Princeton University Press)  
Stylegar, F.A. (2013) Håkon jarl (Spartacus forlag)

External links
Korsvikaspillet: Håkon og Kark

10th-century Norwegian monarchs
10th-century murdered monarchs
Norwegian earls
Norwegian military leaders
Viking rulers
Ladejarl dynasty
Year of birth uncertain
930s births
995 deaths
10th-century Vikings